is a bus terminal at Shirakawa, Gifu (village) in Japan. Bus services are provided by Kaetsuno Bus, Nohi Bus, and Gifu Bus.

Outline

The bus terminal is located near Ogimachi Crossroad on the Japan National Route 156 which is located the north of Ogimachi Hamlet(Shirakawa Village).

In Shiragkawago, since it was registered on World Heritage Site in 1995, visitors and vehicles have been increasing, so the village was desired to preserve World Heritage Site. And, citizen who live in Shirakawa-go suggested to build a new bus terminal in concurrence with discontinuing parking areas and forbidding passing through road of the village, and determined demand of citizen on regular general meeting "OYORIAI" on 23 December 2012.。

Others, almost all route buses departed from and arrived at "Seseragi Park" heretofore, but the safety of traffic was negative impact due to increasing of foreign nationals and inauguration of extending to Kanazawa Station of Hokuriku Shinkansen. What was worse, "Deai Bridge" connected "Seseragi Park" with Ogimachi Hamlet was narrow viaduct, so the village were full of visitors.

From above, the village forwarded streamlining a new bus terminal on the site of Shirakawa Clinic. On 21 June 2016, an ordinance which was determined importance items was issued. And, 1 October 2016, the bus terminal was started to operate.

History 
 On 23 December - Citizen who live in Shirakawa-go suggested to build a new bus terminal in concurrence with discontinuing parking areas and forbidding passing through road of the village, and determined demand of citizen on regular general meeting "OYORIAI"
 On 2016
1 October - Started to operate.
 7 October 2017 - Started to operate machine of exchanging.
On 2018
5 November and 10 December - Stamp rally of the "Higurashi When They Cry" was held in the village and the bus terminal was selected freebies exchange.

Facilities

The bus terminal established near the Ogimachi Crossroad.
 waiting room
 Toilet
 Auto machine of exchanging.
 Information desk and sale for tickets

Highway and limited express, route Buses

Others
The bus terminal build on the site of Shirakawa Clinic which originated Irie Clinic in Higurashi When They Cry.

Surrounding areas
Shirakawa-go

References

Higurashi When They Cry

External links
 Official Website

Bus stations in Japan
Buildings and structures in Gifu Prefecture
Shirakawa, Gifu (village)
Transport infrastructure completed in 2016
2016 establishments in Japan
Transport in Gifu Prefecture